In mathematics, specifically in abstract algebra, a prime element of a commutative ring is an object satisfying certain properties similar to the prime numbers in the integers and to irreducible polynomials. Care should be taken to distinguish prime elements from irreducible elements, a concept which is the same in UFDs but not the same in general.

Definition
With this definition, Euclid's lemma is the assertion that prime numbers are prime elements in the ring of integers. (Note that in an integral domain, the ideal  is a prime ideal, but  is an exception in the definition of 'prime element'.)

Interest in prime elements comes from the fundamental theorem of arithmetic, which asserts that each nonzero integer can be written in essentially only one way as 1 or −1 multiplied by a product of positive prime numbers. This led to the study of unique factorization domains, which generalize what was just illustrated in the integers.

Connection with prime ideals

An ideal  in the ring  (with unity) is prime if the factor ring  is an integral domain.

In an integral domain, a nonzero principal ideal is prime if and only if it is generated by a prime element.

Irreducible elements

Prime elements should not be confused with irreducible elements.  In an integral domain, every prime is irreducible but the converse is not true in general.  However, in unique factorization domains, or more generally in GCD domains, primes and irreducibles are the same.

Examples
The following are examples of prime elements in rings:
 2 in the quotient ring 
  is prime but not irreducible in the ring 
 In the ring  of pairs of integers,  is prime but not irreducible (one has ).
 In the ring of algebraic integers  the element  is irreducible but not prime (as 3 divides  and 3 does not divide any factor on the right).

References
Notes

Sources
Section III.3 of 

Ring theory